Barringtonia is a genus of flowering plants in the family Lecythidaceae first described as a genus with this name in 1775. It is native to Africa, southern Asia, Australia, and various islands of the Pacific and Indian Oceans. The genus name commemorates Daines Barrington.

Species list
The following is a list of species of Barringtonia accepted by the World Checklist of Selected Plant Families as at April 2022:

Gallery

References

External links
 
 
 View a map of recorded sightings of Barringtonia at the Australasian Virtual Herbarium

 
Ericales genera
Taxonomy articles created by Polbot